Christopher Mitchell may refer to:

 Christopher Mitchell (actor), British actor
 Christopher Mitchell (anthropologist), British anthropologist

See also
 Chris Mitchell (disambiguation)